Anthapuram may refer to:

Anthahpuram, a 1998 Indian Telugu-language film
Anthappuram, a 1980 Indian Malayalam-language film